Sheraton is a late 18th-century Neoclassical English furniture style, in vogue  1785–1820, that was coined by 19th-century collectors and dealers to credit furniture designer Thomas Sheraton, whose books, The Cabinet Dictionary (1803) of engraved designs and the Cabinet Maker's & Upholsterer's Drawing Book (1791) of furniture patterns exemplify this style.

The Sheraton style was inspired by the Louis XVI style and features round tapered legs, fluting and most notably contrasting veneer inlays. Sheraton style furniture takes lightweight rectilinear forms, using satinwood, mahogany and tulipwood, sycamore and rosewood for inlaid decorations, though painted finishes and brass fittings are also to be found. Swags, husks, flutings, festoons, and rams' heads are amongst the common motifs applied to pieces of this style.

The style brought the Neoclassical taste of architects like Robert Adam within reach of the middle class. In many respects Sheraton style corresponds with the contemporary Directoire style of France. The Sheraton style was the most reproduced style in the United States during the Federal period.

References

External links 
 Illustrated catalogue of old Chippendale, Sheraton and Hepplewhite furniture of great rarity and beauty, American Art association, 1916
 Sheraton Furniture, The Charleston Museum

History of furniture
Neoclassicism
English furniture
18th century in England
19th century in England